The Bosnia and Herzegovina national badminton team represents Bosnia and Herzegovina in international badminton team competitions. It is controlled by the Badminton Association of Bosnia and Herzegovina, also known as BSBIH (Bosnian: Badminton savez Bosne i Hercegovine). The Bosnian national team competes in the regional Balkan Badminton Championships.

The Bosnian team was ranked 101st on the BWF World Team Ranking in 2014.

Participation in Balkan Badminton Championships 
The Balkan Badminton Championships is a series of tournaments organized by the Balkan Badminton Association and involves participants from countries in the Balkans. The junior team championships are divided into four different age groups, which are U19, U17, U15 and U13.

U17

U15

Current squad 

Men
Vladimir Janković
Lazar Peurača
Boban Stevanić
Marko Tejić
Miroslav Kočić
Stefan Pavičić
Aleksandar Egić
Marko Kočić
Dragan Tomić

Women
Una Bosnić
Dajana Popović
Ivana Stevanić
Elena Kevac
Milica Kos
Milana Kozomora
Biljana Novaković
Nikolina Čenić

References 

Badminton
National badminton teams
Badminton in Bosnia and Herzegovina